Bielany is a district of Warsaw.

Bielany may also refer to the following places in Poland:
 Bielany, Kraków, a neighbourhood in Kraków
 Bielany, a district of Toruń
Bielany, Lesser Poland Voivodeship (south Poland)
Bielany, Lower Silesian Voivodeship (south-west Poland)
Bielany, Lublin Voivodeship (east Poland)
Bielany, Grójec County in Masovian Voivodeship (east-central Poland)
Bielany, Lipsko County in Masovian Voivodeship (east-central Poland)
Bielany, Płońsk County in Masovian Voivodeship (east-central Poland)
Bielany, Pułtusk County in Masovian Voivodeship (east-central Poland)
Bielany, Sokołów County in Masovian Voivodeship (east-central Poland)